Philip III (1 May 1245 – 5 October 1285), called the Bold, was King of France from 1270 until his death in 1285. His father, Louis IX, died in Tunis during the Eighth Crusade.  Philip, who was accompanying him, returned to France and was anointed king at Reims in 1271.

Philip inherited numerous territorial lands during his reign, the most notable being the County of Toulouse, which was annexed to the royal domain in 1271. With the Treaty of Orléans, he expanded French influence into the Kingdom of Navarre and following the death of his brother Peter during the Sicilian Vespers, the County of Alençon was returned to the crown lands.

Following the Sicilian Vespers, Philip led the Aragonese Crusade in support of his uncle. Initially successful, Philip, his army racked with sickness, was forced to retreat and died from dysentery in Perpignan in 1285.  He was succeeded by his son Philip IV.

Early life
Philip was born in Poissy on 1 May 1245, the second son of King Louis IX of France and Margaret of Provence. As a younger son, Philip was not expected to rule France. At the death of his older brother Louis in 1260, he became the heir apparent to the throne.

Philip's mother Margaret made him promise to remain under her tutelage until the age of 30, however Pope Urban IV released him from this oath on 6 June 1263. From that moment on, Pierre de la Broce, a royal favourite and household official of Louis IX, was Philip's mentor. His father, Louis, also provided him with advice, writing in particular the Enseignements, which inculcated the notion of justice as the first duty of a king.

According to the terms of the Treaty of Corbeil (1258), concluded on 11 March 1258 between Louis IX and James I of Aragon, Philip was married in 1262 to Isabella of Aragon in Clermont by the archbishop of Rouen, Eudes Rigaud.

Crusade

As Count of Orléans, Philip accompanied his father on the Eighth Crusade to Tunis in 1270. Shortly before his departure, Louis IX had given the regency of the kingdom into the hands of Mathieu de Vendôme and Simon II, Count of Clermont, to whom he had also entrusted the royal seal. After taking Carthage, the army was struck by an epidemic of dysentery, which spared neither Philip nor his family. His brother John Tristan, Count of Valois died first, on 3 August, and on 25 August the King died. To prevent putrefaction of his remains, it was decided to carry out mos Teutonicus, the process of rendering the flesh from the bones so as to make transporting the remains feasible.

Philip, only 25 years old and stricken with dysentery, was proclaimed king in Tunis. His uncle, Charles I of Naples, negotiated with Muhammad I al-Mustansir, Hafsid Caliph of Tunis. A treaty was concluded 5 November 1270 between the kings of France, Sicily and Navarre and the Caliph of Tunis.

Other deaths followed this debacle. In December, in Trapani, Sicily, Philip's brother-in-law, King Theobald II of Navarre, died. He was followed in February by Philip's wife, Isabella, who fell off her horse while pregnant with their fifth child. She died in Cozenza (Calabria). In April, Theobald's widow and Philip's sister, Isabella, also died.

Philip III arrived in Paris on 21 May 1271, and paid tribute to the deceased. The next day the funeral of his father was held. The new sovereign was crowned king of France in Reims on 15 August 1271.

Reign
Philip maintained most of his father's domestic policies. This included the royal ordinances passed against seigneurial warfare by his father in 1258, which he reinforced by passing his own ordinance in October 1274. Philip followed in his father's footsteps concerning Jews in France, claiming piety as his motivation. Upon his return to Paris 23 September 1271, Philip reenacted his father's order that Jews wear badges. His charter in 1283 banned the construction and repair of synagogues and Jewish cemeteries, banned Jews from employing Christians, and sought to restrain Jewish strepiti (chanting too loudly).

On 21 August 1271, Philip's uncle, Alphonse, Count of Poitiers and Toulouse, died childless in Savona. Philip inherited Alphonse's lands and united them with the royal domain. This inheritance included a portion of Auvergne, later the Duchy of Auvergne and the Agenais. In accordance with the wishes of Alphonse, Philip granted the Comtat Venaissin to Pope Gregory X in 1274. Several years later the Treaty of Amiens (1279) with King Edward I restored Agenais to the English.

On 19 September 1271, Philip commanded the Seneschal of Toulouse to record oaths of loyalty from nobles and town councils. The following year, Roger-Bernard III, Count of Foix, invaded the County of Toulouse, killed several royal officials, and captured the town of Sombuy. Philip's royal seneschal, Eustache de Beaumarchès, led a counter-attack into the County of Foix, until ordered by Philip to withdraw. Philip and his army arrived at Toulouse on 25 May 1272, and on 1 June at Boulbonne met James I of Aragon, who attempted to mediate the issue, but this was rejected by Roger-Bernard. Philip then proceeded on a campaign to devastate and depopulate the County of Foix. By 5 June Roger-Bernard had surrendered, was incarcerated at Carcassonne, and placed in chains. Philip imprisoned him for a year, but then freed him and restored his lands.

Treaty with Navarre
Following the death of King Henry I of Navarre in 1274, Alfonso X of Castile attempted to gain the crown of Navarre from Henry's heiress, Joan. Ferdinand de la Cerda, the son of Alfonso X, arrived at Viana with an army. At the same time, Alfonso sought papal approval for a marriage between one of his grandsons and Joan. Henry's widow, Blanche of Artois, was also receiving marriage proposals for Joan from England and Aragon. Faced with an invading army and foreign proposals, Blanche sought assistance from her cousin, Philip. Philip saw a territorial gain, while Joan would have the military assistance to protect her kingdom. The Treaty of Orléans of 1275, between Philip and Blanche, arranged the marriage between a son of Philip (Louis or Philip) and Blanche's daughter, Joan. The treaty indicated that Navarre would be administered from Paris by appointed governors. By May 1276, French governors were traveling throughout Navarre collecting oaths of fealty to the young Queen. The Navarrese populace, unhappy with the pro-French treaty and French governors, formed two rebellious factions, one pro-Castilian, the other pro-Aragonese.

Navarrese revolt
In September 1276, Philip, faced with open rebellion, sent Robert II, Count of Artois to Pamplona with an army. Philip arrived in Bearn in November 1276 with another army, by which time Robert had pacified the situation and extracted oaths of homage from Navarrese nobles and castellans. Despite the revolt being quickly pacified, it was not until the spring of 1277 that the Kingdoms of Castile and Aragon renounced their intentions of matrimony. Philip received a formal rebuke from Pope Nicholas III for the damage inflicted throughout Navarre.

Sicilian Vespers
In 1282, King Peter III of Aragon invaded Sicily, instigating the Sicilian Vespers rebellion against King Charles I of Naples, Philip's uncle. The success of the rebellion and invasion led to the coronation of Peter as king of Sicily on 4 September 1282. Pope Martin IV excommunicated Peter and declared his kingdom forfeit. Martin then granted Aragon to Philip's son, Charles, Count of Valois. Philip's brother, Peter, Count of Perche, who had joined Charles to suppress the rebellion, was killed in Reggio Calabria. He died without issue and the County of Alençon returned to the royal domain in 1286.

Aragonese Crusade and death
Philip, at the urging of his wife, Marie of Brabant, and his uncle, Charles of Naples, launched a war against the Kingdom of Aragon. The war took the name "Aragonese Crusade" from its papal sanction; nevertheless, one historian labelled it "perhaps the most unjust, unnecessary and calamitous enterprise ever undertaken by the Capetian monarchy." Philip, accompanied by his sons, entered Roussillon at the head of a large army. By 26 June 1285, he had entrenched his army before Girona and besieged the city. Despite strong resistance, Philip took Girona on 7 September 1285.
Philip quickly experienced a reversal, as an epidemic of dysentery hit the French camp and afflicted Philip personally. The French had started a withdrawal when the Aragonese attacked and easily defeated the former at the Battle of the Col de Panissars on 1 October. Philip died of dysentery in Perpignan on 5 October 1285. His son, Philip the Fair, succeeded him as king of France. Following the mos Teutonicus custom, his body was divided in several parts, each buried in different places; the flesh was sent to the Narbonne Cathedral, the entrails to La Noë Abbey in Normandy, his heart to the now-demolished Church of the Couvent des Jacobins in Paris and his bones to Basilica of St Denis, at the time north of Paris.

Marriage and children
On 28 May 1262, Philip married Isabella, daughter of King James I of Aragon and his second wife Yolande of Hungary. They had the following children:
Louis (1264 - May 1276).
Philip IV of France (1268 – 29 November 1314), his successor, married Joan I of Navarre
Robert (1269–1271)
Charles, Count of Valois (12 March 1270 – 16 December 1325), Count of Valois from 1284, married first to Margaret of Naples (Countess of Anjou) in 1290, second to Catherine I of Courtenay in 1302, and last to Mahaut of Chatillon in 1308
Stillborn son (1271)

After the death of Queen Isabella, he married on 21 August 1274 Marie, daughter of the late Henry III, Duke of Brabant, and Adelaide of Burgundy, Duchess of Brabant. Their children were:
Louis, Count of Évreux (May 1276 – 19 May 1319), Count of Évreux from 1298, married Margaret of Artois
Blanche of France, Duchess of Austria (1278 – 19 March 1305, Vienna), married Duke, the future king Rudolf I of Bohemia and Poland, on 25 May 1300.
Margaret of France, Queen of England (1282 – 14 February 1318), married King Edward I of England on 8 September 1299

Legacy
During Philip's reign the royal domain expanded, acquiring the County of Guînes in 1281, the County of Toulouse in 1271, the County of Alençon in 1286, the Duchy of Auvergne in 1271, and through the marriage of his son Philip, the Kingdom of Navarre. He largely continued his father's policies and left his father's administrators in place. His attempt to conquer Aragon nearly bankrupted the French monarchy, causing financial challenges for his successor.

Review from Dante
In the Divine Comedy, the Italian poet Dante envisions the spirit of Philip outside the gates of Purgatory with a number of other contemporary European rulers. Dante does not name Philip directly, but refers to him as "the small-nosed" and "the father of the Pest of France," a reference to King Philip IV of France.

Notes

References

Sources

1245 births
1285 deaths
13th-century kings of France
People from Poissy
Burials at the Basilica of Saint-Denis
House of Capet
Counts of Orléans
Christians of the Eighth Crusade
People of the War of the Sicilian Vespers
Deaths from dysentery
Sons of kings
Children of Louis IX of France